Terisa is a feminine given name, a variant of Teresa and Theresa.

List of people with the given name 
 Terisa Greenan (born 1967), American film producer, film director, writer and stage and film actress
 Terisa Griffin, singer
 Terisa Ngobi, Samoan-New Zealander politician
 Terisa Siagatonu, Samoan singer
 Terisa Tang (1953–1995), Taiwanese singer, actress and musician

Feminine given names
English-language feminine given names